IC 4592 (also known as the Blue Horsehead Nebula) is a reflection nebula in the Scorpius constellation that is lit by Nu Scorpii.

External links 
 
 IC 4592 in NASA/IPAC Extragalactic Database
 IC 4592 in SIMBAD Database
 IC 4592 at seds.org
 
 

4592
Reflection nebulae
Scorpius (constellation)